The American Society for Clinical Investigation (ASCI), established in 1908, is one of the oldest and most respected medical honor societies in the United States.

Organization and purpose
The ASCI is an honorary society to which more than 2,800 physician-scientists from all medical specialties belong. Prospective members are proposed by standing members of the society and elected to ASCI on the basis of an outstanding record of scholarly achievement in biomedical research. The ASCI includes physician-scientists who are active clinically, in basic research, or in teaching. Many of its senior members are widely recognized leaders in academic medicine. As of 2015 the membership of ASCI has included 417 members of the National Academy of Medicine, 191 members of the National Academies of Sciences, Engineering, and Medicine, 40 Lasker Award winners, and 19 Nobel laureates.

The ASCI supports the research into basic mechanisms and/or treatment of human diseases, and to the education of future generations of physician-scientists. The ASCI considers the nominations of several hundred physician-scientists from the United States and abroad each year and elects up to 80 new members each year for their significant research accomplishments relatively early in their careers.

The ASCI is a member of the Federation of American Societies for Experimental Biology (FASEB), which includes numerous biomedical research societies. The ASCI publishes the peer-reviewed biomedical research journals Journal of Clinical Investigation and JCI Insight.

A collection of the society's papers is held at the National Library of Medicine.

History
The American Society for Clinical Investigation has its origins in a chance meeting in June 1907 on the Atlantic City boardwalk, in which Samuel James Meltzer, David Linn Edsall, Wilder Tileston, Warfield Theobald Longcope, and probably Joseph Hersey Pratt were present. The parties to this meeting considered the need for a new society, separate from the Association of American Physicians (AAP), whose membership was at that time limited to 160 individuals. The purpose of the new society would be to give younger men who were not yet members of the AAP, and not eligible for membership in the AAP, the advantages of meeting other young men active in medical research. The new organization was formally constituted on May 11, 1908, at the New Willard Hotel in Washington. A total of 32 physicians agreed to become charter members of ASCI in 1908. The first meeting of the ASCI was held in Atlantic City on May 10, 1909. The organization was also known as the "Young Turks" in allusion to the rebellious spirit in which it was founded, as a counterweight to the older and more deeply established Association of American Physicians (colloquially known as the "Old Turks" in subsequent years).

Stanley J. Korsmeyer Award
Since 1998, the ASCI has awarded an annual prize to a scientist renowned for advancing his/her field and mentoring future scientists. Originally called the "ASCI Award", it was renamed in 2006 in honor of Stanley Korsmeyer, the award's first recipient, who had died the previous year. The awardee receives a US$20,000 honorarium and presents the Korsmeyer Lecture at the Society's annual meeting.

See also
American Physician Scientists Association

References

External links
History of the ASCI, 1909-1959
Website of the ASCI
Honors accorded members of ASCI
ASCI membership list
 American Society for Clinical Investigation Records (1907-1977)—National Library of Medicine finding aid

Honor societies
1908 establishments in the United States
Student organizations established in 1908
Organizations based in Ann Arbor, Michigan